Phil Schilling was an editor at Cycle magazine from 1970 until approximately 1988, including nine years as editor-in-chief.  For his contributions to journalism and motorcycle racing, he was inducted to AMA Motorcycle Hall of Fame in 2011.

Racing

In 1977, he helped to create the 750SS that won Ducati's first AMA Superbike title and brought the Ducati marque to the attention of the American public. The process was documented in Cycle's "Racer Road" series.

Bibliography

References

External links
 Obituary

American magazine editors
Living people
Year of birth missing (living people)